Jesús Francisco Félix (born 9 April 1982) is a Dominican tennis player.

Francisco Félix has a career high ATP singles ranking of 1715 achieved on 8 December 2014.

Francisco Félix has a career-high ITF juniors ranking of 511, achieved on 3 January 2000.

Francisco Félix represented Dominican Republic at the 2006, 2009, and the 2010 Davis Cup, where he has a W/L record of 2–3.

Davis Cup

Participations: (2–3)

   indicates the outcome of the Davis Cup match followed by the score, date, place of event, the zonal classification and its phase, and the court surface.

References

External links

1982 births
Living people
Dominican Republic male tennis players
Sportspeople from Santo Domingo